The Benjamin Nye Homestead is a historic house museum in Sandwich, Massachusetts.  The earliest portion of the 2.5-story timber-frame house was built c. 1680 by Benjamin Nye, and has remained in the hands of his descendants for most of the time since then. It was apparently originally built as a saltbox style house with an integral leanto section, with the rear of the house being raise to a full two stories, probably in the 19th century.  The house was sold out of the Nye family to the state of Massachusetts in 1924, but was poorly maintained by the state.  With the house threatened with demolition in 1962, the Nye Family Association acquired the property and restored the house.  The house was listed on the National Register of Historic Places in 1992.

The Nye Family Association now operates the property as a historic house museum, featuring 18th century furnishings, and is open for tours from June through October.

See also
National Register of Historic Places listings in Barnstable County, Massachusetts

References

External links
Nye Family Association

Historic house museums in Massachusetts
Museums in Barnstable County, Massachusetts
Houses in Barnstable County, Massachusetts
Buildings and structures in Sandwich, Massachusetts
National Register of Historic Places in Barnstable County, Massachusetts
Houses on the National Register of Historic Places in Barnstable County, Massachusetts